The 1994 congressional elections in New Hampshire were held on November 8, 1994, to determine who will represent the state of New Hampshire in the United States House of Representatives. Representatives are elected for two-year terms; those elected served in the 104th Congress from January 1995 until January 1997.  New Hampshire has two seats in the House, apportioned according to the 1990 United States census.

Overview

References

1994
New Hampshire
1994 New Hampshire elections